Gerhard Mans (19 April 1962 – 4 May 2022) was a Namibian rugby union player. He was the father of Gerhard Mans, who represented Namibia in cycling.

Playing career

Born in Karasburg, a small town in southern South West Africa (now Namibia), Mans attended school in Gobabis and after school moved to Bloemfontein, South Africa for tertiary studies at the University of the Orange Free State.

He made his senior provincial debut in South Africa for the Orange Free State in 1982 and in 1985 returned to his home country.  At the time South West Africa participated in the South African domestic rugby competitions. In 1987 Mans was appointed captain of South West Africa and under his leadership during 1987, South West Africa won the B division of the Currie Cup and gained promotion to the A division for the 1988 season.

In 1990, Namibia gained independence and consequently withdrew from the South African rugby competitions. Mans was selected as captain for the first Namibian national side after independence. Namibia played its first test match on 24 March 1990 in Windhoek against Zimbabwe and Mans scored one of his team's six tries in a 33–18 victory. In his second test, against Portugal, he scored a record six tries. Mans continued to play 27 test matches and scored 26 tries for Namibia and also captained the team 26 times. The only occasion that he did not captain the team, was during the 1995 World Cup qualifying final group stages against the Ivory Coast, when he played as a replacement and the team was captained by Henning Snyman. Mans retired at the end of the 1994 season, after Namibia failed to qualify for the 1995 World Cup.

Test history

Accolades

Mans was one of the five nominees for 1988 SA Rugby player of the Year award. The other nominees for the award were Adolf Malan, Calla Scholtz, Tiaan Strauss and the eventual winner of the award, Naas Botha.

References

1962 births
2022 deaths 
Road incident deaths in Namibia
Namibian expatriates in South Africa
Namibia international rugby union players
Free State Cheetahs players
People from ǁKaras Region
Rugby union fullbacks